The Green Plain Monthly Meetinghouse is a historic former Quaker house of worship near South Charleston in Clark County, Ohio, United States.  Built in 1843, it was used by a part of a monthly meeting that was established in the area in 1822.  The original Green Plain Monthly Meeting lasted for only a short while, splitting into Orthodox and Hicksite branches just four years after it was founded: the Orthodox members settled in the community of Selma, while the Hicksites kept the original property.  In turn, the Hicksites split in 1843 over the issue of slavery; the liberal party kept the original church, while the conservatives moved to South Charleston-Clifton Road and built the present building.

Built of brick, the Green Plain Monthly Meetinghouse is a Greek Revival building; in line with the simple habits of its builders, the meetinghouse features few adornments.  It has been virtually unchanged since its construction, still retaining original elements such as the structural separation between the men's side and the women's side of the interior.

In 1982, the meetinghouse was listed on the National Register of Historic Places.  It qualified because of its historically significant architecture: few so well-preserved and little-changed Quaker meetinghouses remain in this region of Ohio, so it permits a nearly unparalleled view of the lives of some early Ohioans.  Included in the historic designation was the monthly meeting's cemetery, which has stones with death dates as far back as 1843.

References

External links

Churches completed in 1843
19th-century Quaker meeting houses
Quaker meeting houses in Ohio
Churches in Clark County, Ohio
National Register of Historic Places in Clark County, Ohio
Cemeteries on the National Register of Historic Places in Ohio
Former churches in Ohio
Greek Revival church buildings in Ohio
Churches on the National Register of Historic Places in Ohio
Former Quaker meeting houses in the United States
1843 establishments in Ohio